Pete Sampras was the defending champion, but did not participate.

Michael Chang won the title after Jan-Michael Gambill retired at the end of the second set of the final due to knee and ankle sprains.

Seeds

  Andre Agassi (withdrew due to back injury)
  Mark Philippoussis (second round)
  Marcelo Ríos (first round, defaulted)
  Michael Chang (champion)
  Wayne Ferreira (quarterfinals)
  Jan-Michael Gambill (final, retired)
  Andrew Ilie (first round)
  Arnaud Clément (semifinals)

Draw

Finals

Top half

Bottom half

References

External links
 2000 Mercedes-Benz Cup draw

Los Angeles Open (tennis)
2000 ATP Tour